The Robert Herridge Theater is a 30-minute American television anthology series of dramas by noted authors like John Steinbeck and Edgar Allan Poe. It was produced and hosted by Robert Herridge for CBS Films, Inc. A total of 26 episodes were broadcast on CBS from 1959 to 1960. Among its guest stars were Robert Duvall, Maureen Stapleton, William Shatner, Sydney Pollack, Miles Davis and Eli Wallach.

References

The Robert Herridge Theater at CTVA

External links

1950s American anthology television series
1960s American anthology television series
1959 American television series debuts
1960 American television series endings
Black-and-white American television shows
CBS original programming